The 1984 Oregon State Beavers football team represented Oregon State University in the Pacific-10 Conference (Pac-10) during the 1984 NCAA Division I-A football season. Led by fifth-year head coach Joe Avezzano, the Beavers were 2–9 overall, (1–7 in Pac-10, ninth). Five home games were played on campus at Parker Stadium in Corvallis, with one at Civic Stadium in Portland.

Schedule

Roster
QB Ricky Greene

References

External links
 Game video – Oregon State at Washington State – November 3, 1984

Oregon State
Oregon State Beavers football seasons
Oregon State Beavers football